Dorcadion steineri is a species of beetle in the family Cerambycidae. It was described by Holzschuh in 1977. It is known from Turkey.

References

steineri
Beetles described in 1977